Derek Noonan (1 February 1947 – 1 May 2009) was an English rugby union and professional rugby league footballer who played in the 1970s and 1980s.

Background
Derek Noonan's birth was registered in St. Helens, Lancashire, England, and he died aged 62 in St. Helens, Merseyside.

Playing career

International honours
Derek Noonan won caps for England while at Warrington in 1975 against Wales, in the 1975 Rugby League World Cup against France, and Wales, and in 1975 against Papua New Guinea (This match was played on 6 July 1975, en route to Australia for the 1975 Rugby League World Cup, and was not classed as a full international, at least at the time).

County honours
Derek Noonan won 5-caps for Lancashire while at Warrington.

World Club Challenge appearances
Derek Noonan played left-, i.e. number 4, in St. Helens' 2–25 defeat by the 1975 NSWRFL season premiers, Eastern Suburbs Roosters in the unofficial 1976 World Club Challenge at Sydney Cricket Ground on Tuesday 29 June 1976.

Challenge Cup Final appearances
Derek Noonan played right-, i.e. number 3, in Warrington's 24–9 victory over Featherstone Rovers in the 1974 Challenge Cup Final during the 1973–74 season at Wembley Stadium, London on Saturday 11 May 1974, in front of a crowd of 77,400, played right-, i.e. number 3, in the 7–14 defeat by Widnes in the 1975 Challenge Cup Final during the 1974–75 season at Wembley Stadium, London on Saturday 10 May 1975, in front of a crowd of 85,998, and played left-, i.e. number 4, in St. Helens' 20–5 victory over Widnes in the 1976 Challenge Cup Final during the 1975–76 season at Wembley Stadium, London on Saturday 8 May 1976, in front of a crowd of 89,982.

BBC2 Floodlit Trophy Final appearances
Derek Noonan played  in Warrington's 0–0 draw with by Salford in the 1974 BBC2 Floodlit Trophy Final during the 1974–75 season at The Willows, Salford on Tuesday 17 December 1974, played  (replaced by interchange/substitute Wilf Briggs) in the 5–10 defeat by Salford in the 1974 BBC2 Floodlit Trophy Final replay during the 1974–75 season at Wilderspool Stadium, Warrington on Tuesday 28 January 1975, and played right-, i.e. number 3, in St. Helens' 11–26 defeat by Hull Kingston Rovers in the 1977 BBC2 Floodlit Trophy Final during the 1977–78 season at Hilton Park, Leigh on Tuesday 13 December 1977.

Player's No.6 Trophy Final appearances
Derek Noonan played right-, i.e. number 3, (replaced by interchange/substitute Billy Pickup) and scored 2-tries in Warrington's 27–16 victory over Rochdale Hornets in the 1973–74 Player's No.6 Trophy Final during the 1973–74 season at Central Park, Wigan on Saturday 9 February 1974.

Captain Morgan Trophy Final appearances
Derek Noonan played right-, i.e. number 3, in Warrington's 4–0 victory over Featherstone Rovers in the 1973–74 Captain Morgan Trophy Final during the 1973–74 season at The Willows, Salford on Saturday 26 January 1974, in front of a crowd of 5,259.

References

External links
Profile at saints.org.uk
Rugby Leaguer & League Express – 4 May 2009 – Page-11 – Sad Farewells
(archived by web.archive.org) Fans of the club from the first Fulham season will be sad to hear of the death of Derek Noonan at the age of 62 from cancer
(archived by web.archive.org) RUGBY LEAGUE JOURNAL – Issue number 27 – Summer 2009
(archived by web.archive.org) Noonan Passes Away
Tributes to ex-Saint Derek Noonan
(archived by web.archive.org) Warrington’s World Cup heroes – Derek Noonan
(archived by web.archive.org) Wakefield Wildcats v London Skolars Mistakenly stated to be an ex-Widnes player of 1979.
(archived by web.archive.org) Warrington Wolves was deeply saddened to hear of the passing of former player Derek Noonan
(archived by web.archive.org) Statistics at wolvesplayers.thisiswarrington.co.uk

1947 births
2009 deaths
England national rugby league team players
English rugby league players
English rugby union players
Lancashire rugby league team players
Liverpool St Helens F.C. players
London Broncos players
Rugby league centres
Rugby league players from St Helens, Merseyside
Rugby union players from St Helens, Merseyside
St Helens R.F.C. players
Warrington Wolves players